Malounta is a village in the Nicosia District of Cyprus, located 2 km north of Klirou.

References

Communities in Nicosia District